Justin McKay is an American college baseball coach and former Outfielder & Pitcher. McKay was the Interim Head Baseball Coach of the NCAA Division I Fairleigh Dickinson Knights baseball team during the 2018-2019 year before retiring after the season.

Playing career
McKay attended American High School in Fremont, California and Shaker High School in Latham, New York. McKay then enrolled at Briarcliffe College, to play college baseball for the nationally ranked Division I NJCAA Briarcliffe College Seahawks baseball team. He served as Team Captain (sports) of the 2006 USCAA National Championship team.

In the summer of 2006, McKay suffered back & ankle injuries limiting his Junior (education year) season. Following completion of his degree, he transferred to Queens College, City University of New York for his Senior (education) year. McKay won the starting centerfield job in spring of 2008 helping the Knights compile the most wins since 2003. Battling injury 
throughout the season, McKay scored 21 runs, while hitting .320 with a .454 on-base percentage (OBP) and 21 RBIs. Following his collegiate career, McKay played in the New York State League before retiring shortly after due to previous injury.

Coaching career
McKay returned to Briarcliffe College to assist his former head coach Gary Puccio. In the fall of 2010, McKay left Briarcliffe with Puccio to become an assistant at Fairleigh Dickinson. On May 30, 2018, McKay was named the interim head coach at Fairleigh Dickinson. In May of 2019, after a 11 year coaching career and his second child on the way, McKay retired from baseball.

Head coaching record

References

External links
Queens Knights bio
Fairleigh Dickinson Knights bio

Living people
Baseball outfielders
Briarcliffe Seahawks baseball players
Queens Knights baseball players
Briarcliffe Seahawks baseball coaches
Fairleigh Dickinson Knights baseball coaches
Montclair State Red Hawks baseball coaches
Year of birth missing (living people)